Daniel Halladay (November 24, 1826 in Marlboro, Vermont – March 1, 1916 in Santa Ana, California) was an American engineer, inventor and businessman, best known for his innovative 1854 self-regulating farm wind pump at Ellington, Connecticut.

His invention of the windmill was a crucial key to the old steam trains as back then, they were mainly powered by water, so the water pumping mechanism (the windmill) helped the advance of trains.

Versions of this windmill became an iconic part of the rural landscape in the United States, Argentina, Canada, New Zealand, and South Africa - mostly because of the role they play in a natural source of electricity.

The historic Windmill at Ruprechtov based on Halladay's invention can be found in Ruprechtov in the Vyškov District of the Czech Republic.

References

1826 births
1916 deaths
19th-century American inventors
Businesspeople from Vermont
Wind power in Connecticut
People from Marlboro, Vermont
Wind power in the United States
19th-century American businesspeople